The electoral district of Marodian was a Legislative Assembly electorate in the state of Queensland. It was first created in a redistribution ahead of the 1950 state election, and existed until the 1960 state election.

Marodian was centred on Gayndah and Goomeri, and incorporated parts of the former Isis and Wide Bay electorates. It was named for Marodian Station, situated between Kilkivan and Brooweena. It replaced the Wide Bay electorate due to confusion between the previous state seat and the federal Division of Wide Bay.

In 1960 Marodian was abolished, it was redistributed between the Barambah, Burnett and Isis electorates.

Members for Marodian
The member for Marodian was:

Election results

See also
 Electoral districts of Queensland
 Members of the Queensland Legislative Assembly by year
 :Category:Members of the Queensland Legislative Assembly by name

References

Former electoral districts of Queensland
1950 establishments in Australia
1960 disestablishments in Australia
Constituencies established in 1950
Constituencies disestablished in 1960